Chris Spheeris (Greek: Χρήστος Σφυρής) is a Greek-American composer of instrumental music. He is a producer, vocalist and multi-instrumentalist. Chris is the cousin of Penelope Spheeris and her brother Jimmie Spheeris. Born in Milwaukee, Wisconsin, Chris began writing songs on his guitar as a teenager.  In 1985, Chris began composing for film.  His work in collaboration with filmmaker Chip Duncan includes the television series Is Anyone Listening, the series Mystic Lands (Discovery Networks), In a Just World (PBS) and the classroom production entitled The Life & Death of Glaciers (Discovery Education).

Discography

Albums

 1978 - Spheeris and Voudouris 
 1980 - Points of View 
 1982 - Primal Tech Music
 1984 – Desires of the heart 
 1988 – Pathways to surrender 
 1990 – Enchantment (with Paul Voudouris)
 1993 – Culture
 1994 – Desires 
 1994 – Passage
 1995 – Europa 
 1996 – Mystic traveller 
 1997 – Eros
 1999 – Dancing with the Muse 
 2001 – Adagio 
 2001 – Brio 
 2011 – Maya (and the Eight Illusions) 
 2013 – Respect 
 2014 – Across Any Distance
 2019 - Mujeres al Alba

Compilations 
 1998 – Crystal Dreams 
 2000 – Platinum 2Cd
 2001 – Best Dreams Mystic Hits Vol 18 
 2001 – The Best 1990–2000 
 2004 – Mediterranean Cafe 
 2005 – Essentials 
 2009 – Greatest Hits

Singles 
 2000 – Allura
 2021 – Hear to Here

References

External links
Personal website

American people of Greek descent
Living people
Greek musicians
Year of birth missing (living people)
Musicians from Milwaukee